A Young professional is a young person not in school who is employed in a profession or white-collar occupation.

Young professional(s) may refer to:

 The Young Professionals, also known as TYP, stylized T¥P, Israeli electro pop band

See also
 Yuppie, young urban professional or young upwardly-mobile professional